Colony class may refer to:

 Colony-class frigate, 21 frigates of the US Tacoma-class frigate loaned to the Royal Navy in World War II and given names of  minor British colonies
 Crown Colony-class cruiser, 11 light cruisers of the Royal Navy launched in the 1930s given the names of major colonies of the UK and generally known as the Fiji class.

See also
 Colony (disambiguation)
 Class (disambiguation)